Les Amants du Pont-Neuf is a 1991 French film directed by Leos Carax, starring Juliette Binoche and Denis Lavant. The film follows a love story between two young vagrants: Alex, a would be circus performer addicted to alcohol and sedatives and Michele, a painter with a disease that is slowly turning her blind. The film had 867,197 admissions in France where it was the 34th highest earning film of 1991. 

The title refers to the Pont Neuf bridge in Paris. The North American title of the film is The Lovers on the Bridge, and, in a mistranslation of the original title, the Australian title is Lovers on the Ninth Bridge (instead of "Lovers on the New Bridge").

Plot 
Set around the Pont Neuf, Paris's oldest bridge, while it was closed for repairs, Les Amants du Pont-Neuf depicts a love story between two young vagrants Alex (Denis Lavant) and Michèle (Juliette Binoche). Alex is a street performer addicted to alcohol and sedatives and Michèle a painter driven to a life on the streets because of a failed relationship and a disease which is slowly destroying her sight. The film portrays their harsh existence living on the bridge with Hans (Klaus Michael Grüber), an older vagrant. As her vision deteriorates Michèle becomes increasingly dependent on Alex. When a possible treatment becomes available, Michèle's family use street posters and radio appeals to trace her. Fearing that she will leave him if she receives the treatment, Alex tries to keep Michèle from becoming aware of her family's attempts to find her. The streets, skies and waterways of Paris are used as a backdrop for the story in a series of set-pieces set during the French Bicentennial celebrations in 1989.

Production

Guiton's documentary notes that from the outset Leos Carax wanted to make a simple film, originally talking about doing it with a small team, in black and white and via Super 8. His first movie Boy Meets Girl had been a small affair, whereas Mauvais Sang had been considerably larger and more costly, albeit more successful at the box office.

From the start, basing a movie on a public bridge in the centre of Paris was complicated. The production team wanted to block off the bridge for 3 months. This was immediately deemed impractical, and the creation of a model was proposed and created by the set designer Michel Vandestein. Initially, the intention was to film the daylight scenes on the actual bridge, and the night time scenes on the simplified model. At this point, the budget of between 8 and 9 million francs had to be adjusted by 5 million. A search for locations across Europe ended up back in France – the town of Lansargues, in the department of Hérault in southern France. Construction began.

At this time, the mayor of Paris gave the authorization for filming in Paris on the Pont Neuf – between 28 July and 18 August. While tying his shoe on set, lead actor Denis Lavant injured the tendon in his thumb so badly that filming could not be completed in the given time. The insurers were called – Carax was pressured to recast the male lead. However the director insisted that he could not recast or change his approach to the film to allow for Lavant's injury. Immediately, the solution was clear – the Lansargues model was to be extended for daytime use. At this point only a few minutes of footage had been shot.

The producers secured a further 9 million francs to develop the set. This extra budget seemed too low given the extent of work required at the Lansargues site. It soon became obvious that more money would be required before shooting could resume. Without this funding the producers were obliged to accept an insurance payment that would settle outstanding debts but not allow any further work. Production was shut down. A frustrated cast and crew took time off to relax and it was not until the 1989 Cannes Film Festival that Dominique Vignier, together with the Swiss millionaire Francis von Buren, agreed to undertake the funding based on the few short rushes filmed a year before.

In the documentary Von Buren clearly states that he was deceived about the upcoming costs he would be forced to take on. The number of 30 million francs, given for the total cost of construction and to finish the film, was not nearly enough; the final number from this stage would be closer to 70 million francs. He withdrew his funding late in 1989 with an estimated loss of 10 million francs. Yet again, production stopped. From October 1989 to June 1990 the only person at the site in Lansargues was the guard – and a number of storms followed over that winter causing massive water damage to the uncompleted set.

At the Cannes festival in 1990, Christian Fechner allocated 70 million francs in order to finish the film. Unable to find financing partners, he provided his own money, purchasing both rights and debts of the picture. Principal photography was completed on 22 December 1990.

Release
The film premiered out of competition at the 1991 Cannes Film Festival before arriving in French theatres on 17 October 1991. The film had 867 197 admissions in France where it was the 34th highest earning film of 1991.

References

External links
 
 

1991 films
1991 romantic drama films
French romantic drama films
1990s French-language films
Films about bridges
Films directed by Leos Carax
Films set in Paris
1990s French films